John Phillips Smith (6 March 1936 – 10 February 2020) was an Australian cricketer. He played one first-class cricket match for Victoria in 1964, against a touring South African side.

See also
 List of Victoria first-class cricketers

References

External links
 

1936 births
2020 deaths
Australian cricketers
Victoria cricketers
Sportspeople from Ballarat